Cotoroaia may refer to several villages in Romania:

 Cotoroaia, a village in Cerțești Commune, Galaţi County
 Cotoroaia, a village in Voloiac Commune, Mehedinţi County

See also 
 Cotorca (disambiguation)
 Cotoru River (disambiguation)